Cleveland Fire Brigade is the statutory fire and rescue service covering the boroughs of Hartlepool, Middlesbrough, Redcar and Cleveland & Stockton-on-Tees in the North East of England. The name originates from the former county of Cleveland which was abolished in 1996. The brigade’s area is split between the ceremonial counties of County Durham and North Yorkshire.

Cleveland is organised operationally into four Districts: Hartlepool, Middlesbrough, Redcar and Cleveland and Stockton-on-Tees.

Performance
In 2018/2019, every fire and rescue service in England and Wales was subjected to a statutory inspection by His Majesty's Inspectorate of Constabulary and Fire & Rescue Services (HIMCFRS). The inspection investigated how well the service performs in each of three areas. On a scale of outstanding, good, requires improvement and inadequate, Cleveland Fire and Rescue Service was rated as follows:

Fire stations

Cleveland Fire Brigade operates 14 fire stations, eight of which are crewed day and night by wholetime firefighters, and six are crewed by retained firefighters who live near to their fire station and can arrive there within five minutes of a call being received.

The brigade works in partnership with the North East Ambulance Service to provide emergency medical cover to areas of East Cleveland. The four stations in Guisborough, Saltburn, Skelton, and Loftus are in areas that have been identified as having a greater need for ambulance cover. The aim of a fire service co-responder team is to preserve life until the arrival of either a Rapid Response Vehicle (RRV) or an ambulance. The appliances are equipped with oxygen and automatic external defibrillation (AED) equipment.

See also
 Fire service in the United Kingdom
 Fire apparatus
 Fire Engine
 FiReControl
 List of British firefighters killed in the line of duty

References

External links

 
Cleveland Fire Brigade at HMICFRS

Fire and rescue services of England
Cleveland, England
Organisations based in North Yorkshire
Organisations based in County Durham